Barbarosa is a 1982 American Western film starring Willie Nelson and Gary Busey about a young cowboy on the run from the law who partners with a famous bandito and learns about life from him. "One of the best overlooked westerns of the last 20 years" according to reviewer LG Writer, and featured on an episode of the television show Siskel & Ebert dedicated to uncovering worthy sleepers, it is "a tale of betrayal, vendetta, honor, and dignity". Barbarosa was the first American-made film by noted Australian director Fred Schepisi.

Plot

Young Karl Westover, a post-Civil War Texas farm boy, accidentally kills his brother-in-law and must flee to Mexico. Early into his flight he is met by the outlaw Barbarosa, who, seconds later, kills a man who was following him, whom he seems to know. Barbarosa takes pity on Karl and shows him how to find water, make a fire, and catch an armadillo for his supper. He leaves and tells Karl to go home to Texas.

Karl makes his way to a small pueblo and finds a grubby cantina. Barbarosa bursts in and robs everyone at gunpoint. Filling his sombrero with loot, Barbarosa instructs Karl to gather the rest, and steals away. Karl escapes, and Barbarosa and he ride together for the winter while Karl learns the life of an outlaw adventurer.

Karl is being pursued by Floyd and Otto Pahmeyer, the brothers of the man he killed, sent by their vengeful father. Karl and Barbarosa easily get the drop on them. To Barbarosa's disgust, Karl leaves them alive and tells them to go home. They say they cannot, being more afraid of their father than the bandidos. They hike off to replace their guns and resume the chase.

The bandidos encounter a poor old couple with a burro, and Karl refuses to rob them. Barbarosa and Karl are then captured by the outlaw Angel Morales and his gang, and as Angel is debating what to do with them, the old couple, Angel's parents, arrive in camp and tell Angel that Barbarosa wanted to rob them, but Karl wanted to spare them. The enraged Angel shoots Barbarosa in the belly. He spares Karl's life for restraining Barbarosa from robbing his parents, but sets him to digging Barbarosa's grave. While digging Barbarosa's grave, it is discovered that he isn't really dead. Barbarosa scuttles off into the brush when no one is looking, and Karl quickly fills in the empty grave.

Angel's gang capture the hapless Floyd and Otto, and Angel shoots them on a whim, again setting Karl to dig the graves. But in the morning, a stuporous Angel struggles awake to find himself buried to the neck in the desert sand, with the dead heads of Floyd and Otto surrounding him. Terrified, he screams fruitlessly for help and for the author of his demise, "Barbaroooooosaaaaaaa!"

Even outlaws must have someplace to call home, it seems. Barbarosa has an ongoing love-hate relationship with the Zavala family. He brings his accumulated loot every few months when he visits his loyal wife, Josefina de Zavala, who lives at the hacienda of her father, Don Braulio Zavala. Intensely bitter, Don Braulio hates Barbarosa for crippling him and killing his son in a drunken fracas, and every few years he sends another young Zavala son, nephew, or cousin to kill Barbarosa; none has yet succeeded, and most have been themselves killed in the attempt. Don Braulio's tales, stylized and heavy with symbolism, spur the young Zavalas to their best efforts to be worthy of such an adversary, and the Zavalas have become rich and powerful thereby. The songs recounting Barbarosa's exploits become longer and more celebratory each year, and recent verses also recount the adventures of Barbarosa's new sidekick, the "Gringo Child."  Yet the chorus between every verse exhorts "all you men of courage to grease up your guns and knives . . . this is the part where they kill Barbarosa."

Barbarosa and Josefina have a nubile daughter, Juanita, who decides she likes the Gringo Child and hides Karl from searchers in her bed. Interrupted by her parents, Karl is kicked into the plaza by the enraged Barbarosa; the ruckus raises Don Braulio and the household, who rush to the plaza, guns blazing. Barbarosa twirls his Appaloosa horse in the gate, whooping, displaying his horsemanship and courage, and the bandidos escape at a gallop amid a hail of bloodless gun play. And when Karl too shows some backbone, telling Barbarosa that he liked Juanita and intends to visit her again, Barbarosa smiles and says that's fine with him.

In the spring, Barbarosa and Karl decide to return to Texas. Climbing out of the Rio Grande canyon, Karl attempts to lend Barbarosa a hand up the final ledge. Karl is hampered by the saddlebags he is holding, so Barbarosa says "Get rid of that!" To which Karl flings the saddlebags (containing the loot) back over the cliff. Terminally disgusted, Barbarosa yells at him, "I didn't say throw the MONEY down THERE!  I've BEEN down THERE!!!". Karl makes the arduous climb back down the cliff. He disturbs a rattlesnake and falls into the river. When Karl struggles back to the canyon rim that evening he finds Barbarosa waiting beside a campfire. He dumps the saddlebags of money at Barbarosa's feet, but Barbarosa is still peeved: "Bet you didn't bring an armadillo for my supper!"  But Karl reveals his other hand from behind his back, tossing a dead armadillo into Barbarosa's lap. Both look at each other and laugh; Karl is learning, and starting to give as good as he gets.

Barbarosa and Karl come to the Texas Hill Country and the German immigrant colony where Karl grew up, and ride into a stockmen's rendezvous. While enjoying eating barbecue and watching horse races, Karl mentions that horses are something he knows about and considers buying some broncos to take home to his father's farm. Suddenly a shot rings out — it is old Mr. Pahmeyer, still seeking to kill Karl for the death of his sons. In his rage, he misses. Karl covers him with his revolver and makes him stop trying to reload. "Go home, Mr. Pahmeyer. Just go home!" he orders, and Mr. Pahmeyer has no choice but to obey.

Karl buys his horses, but Barbarosa declines to accompany him back to lawful living. "To tell the truth, I'm worn out keeping you amused," he grumbles. The two part ways as friends.

Karl drives his herd to the farm and finds the farm very run down, his mother dead, himself given up for dead, and his father, Emile and his sister Hilda, despondent. He cheers them up, telling them that he "had a little luck down in Mexico -- me and another fellow."  Next morning Emile steps outside to inspect "our horses."  "OUR horses?" jokes Karl. "You'd best break a few before it's 'OUR horses'!", and Hilda laughs with them. But their laughter turns to screams as Mr. Pahmeyer takes another potshot from the woods, again missing Karl but killing his father.

Karl goes alone to the Pahmeyer farmhouse, calling Mr. Pahmeyer to come out and end the feud. Mr. Pahmeyer calls back that he is sorry about killing Emile, that he never intended to do that. Karl calls back that he knows that, and again offers to end the feud. But despite the cries of his wife, Mr. Pahmeyer calls, "I don't think I can do it!" and charges out the door with his gun. Howling, "NOOOOO!", Karl is forced to kill him.

Karl and Barbarosa reunite after some time (Karl's beard and hair have grown out). During a brief split, Karl aids Barbarosa in evading Eduardo Zavala, the most recent young would-be killer sent out by Don Braulio. Without Barbarosa's knowledge, he disarms Eduardo and strips him of his guns, his horse, and his boots. "WALK home! Git!" he orders Eduardo.

But Eduardo is made of sterner stuff than his predecessors. He hones his silver crucifix down to a dagger point, wraps his feet in rawhide thongs, and stalks Barbarosa on foot. He leaps upon Barbarosa from ambush and stabs him in the belly, then flees to the south.

As Karl sits with his dying friend, they discuss Barbarosa's life and death. "A man couldn't ask for better than what I had with the Zavalas," Barbarosa says. And then, "The little bastard's going back to tell everyone Barbarosa's dead. Barbarosa can't die!"  Karl realizes, "He's afoot!" and may be caught before he gets back to the Zavala hacienda.

Karl cremates Barbarosa's body, and pursues Eduardo at the gallop. But Eduardo has learned, and knocks Karl out by hitting him with a branch. Taking Karl's horse, Eduardo makes it back to the hacienda and is greeted as a hero. A fiesta is planned in his honor.

Karl sits beside a campfire, defeated, nursing his headache. There is a rustle in the brush, and out comes Barbarosa's Appaloosa, with Barbarosa's saddle and enormous sombrero. Karl perks up.

The fiesta at the Zavala hacienda is the most funereal party imaginable. Don Braulio, Josefina and Jaunita look lost and bereft. The rest of the clan dances while contemplating directionless life without a Barbarosa to fight. Out of the night gallops a red-bearded man in an enormous sombrero on an Appaloosa, whooping and twirling and shooting up the sky. As Eduardo is about to be presented a black wreath of honor, Karl aims and shoots the wreath just before it is placed on his head. The Zavalas shout, "Barbarosa!  Barbarosa!  Barbarosaaaa!" and scramble for their guns and knives.

Cast
 Willie Nelson as Barbarosa
 Gary Busey as Karl Westover
 Gilbert Roland as Don Braulio Zavala
 Isela Vega as Josephina
 Danny De La Paz as Eduardo
 Alma Martinez as Juanita
 George Voskovec as Herman Pahmeyer
 Sharon Compton as Hilda
 Howland Chamberlain as Emile
 Harry Caesar as Sims
 Wolf Muser as Floyd
 Kai Wulff as Otto
 Roberto Contreras as Cantina Owner
 Luis Contreras as Angel Morales
 Itasco Wilson as Mattie
 Bruce Smith as Photographer
 Sonia de León as Old Prostitute (as Joannelle Nadine Romero)
 Michael S. O'Rourke as Brither (as Michael O'Rourke)
 Bentley H. Garrett as Bartender
 Allison Wittliff as Emily
 Juan José Martínez as 1st Boy (as Juan Jose Martinez)
 Rene Luna as 2nd Boy (as Rene Luna)
 Christoper García as 3rd Boy
 Philip Pena as 4th Boy (as Philip Peña
 Jake Busey as Cook Boy
 Reid Wittliff as Cook Boy
 Bill Couch as Stunt Double 
 Chuck Couch as Stunt Double

Reception
The film received critical acclaim. It currently has a 100% rating on Rotten Tomatoes based on five reviews. In a contemporary review, Pauline Kael called it "spirited and satisfying", and offered particular praise for Willie Nelson's unexpectedly "great screen presence".

References

External links

 
 

1982 films
1980s English-language films
1982 Western (genre) films
American Western (genre) films
Films set in Texas
Films shot in Texas
Films directed by Fred Schepisi
Films scored by Bruce Smeaton
ITC Entertainment films
Universal Pictures films
1980s American films